Handels-og Kontorfunktionaerernes Forbund I Danmark v Dansk Arbejdsgiverforening, acting on behalf of Danfoss (1989) C-109/88 is an EU labour law case, which held that if an employer is to justify indirect discrimination, measures taken must be directly related to being able to do the job.

Facts
Pay in the workplace was set according to adaptability, training and seniority. The effect was that women were paid less.

Judgment
ECJ held that adaptability to variable hours, place of work or training was justifiable only if these criteria were ‘of importance for the performance of specific tasks entrusted to the employee’.
However, it also added that, ‘length of service goes hand in hand with experience and since experience generally enables the employee to perform his duties better, the employer is free to reward it without having to establish the importance it has in the performance of specific tasks entrusted to the employee’.

See also

Notes

Anti-discrimination law
Sexism
European Union labour case law
1989 in the European Economic Community
1989 in case law